David Richardson (born 20 March 1987) is an Australian television actor.

Career
Richardson has had major roles in two Australian children's television drama series. He was one of the regular cast members in Parallax in 2004, playing four versions of Francis Short from different parallel universes. This was followed up by the starring role in three series of Streetsmartz as Vinnie Martino in 2005 and 2006.

Since dropping out of Western Australian Academy of Performing Arts (WAAPA), Richardson has starred in a number of short films, including an adaptation of the Stephen King short story Cain Rose Up, and on stage, most notably in an adaptation of Lord of the Flies.

In 2010, he had a small role in the Australian thriller Wasted on the Young.

Some of Mr Richardson's more recent work includes a television advertisement with Boxer Danny Green. In 2014 the commercial was broadcast Australia wide to promote the dangers of drug and alcohol related violence.

Filmography
 Streetsmartz (2005–06) as Vinnie Martino
 Parallax (2004) as Francis Short

References
 
 Tv.com David Richardson Biography
 TV.com Streetsmartz
 TV.com Parallax

1987 births
Living people
Australian male television actors
Australian people of New Zealand descent